The British Rally Championship is a rallying series run over the course of a year, that comprises seven tarmac and gravel surface events. 2023 is to be the 65th season of the series. The season begins in Cumbria on 11 March and is due to conclude on 27/28 October in the Welsh forests.

2023 calendar
For season 2023 there will be seven events, four on gravel and three on closed road tarmac surfaces.

2023 events podium

2023 British Rally Championship for Drivers

Scoring system

Points are awarded as follows: 25, 18, 15, 12, 10, 8, 6, 4, 2, 1. Drivers may nominate one event as their 'joker', on which they will score additional points: 5, 4, 3, 2, 1. Competitors five best scores will count towards their championship total.

References

British Rally Championship seasons
Rally Championship
British Rally Championship
British Rally Championship